Abdulcelâl Hayrulla Meñbariyev (1902 — 1960) was a politician who served as the chairman of the Presidium of the Supreme Soviet of the Crimean ASSR from 1937 to 1944.

Life 
He was a member of the Communist party since 1927, and a senior member of Crimean ASSR leadership.  He was evacuated from the peninsula soon after the German invasion of the Soviet Union, and had his family sent to the Uzbek SSR, but returned on 14 April 1944 after German troops were expelled from Simferopol. However, barely a month later he and Ismail Seyfullaev (Chairman of the Council of People's Commissars of the Crimean ASSR) were summoned to the office of the first secretary of the Crimean Regional Party Committee, where they were told of the resolution ordering the deportation of all Crimean Tatars from Crimea and asked to assist with the deportation by Bogdan Kobulov. After deportation he lived in Andijan, initially working at a school and a factory before receiving a pension and moving to Stalingrad. While residing in the Uzbek SSR other Crimean Tatars repeatedly asked him to join and support their calls for restoration of the Crimean ASSR and right of return, but he categorically refused to assist the Crimean Tatar civil rights movement in any way.

See also 
 Seit Tairov

References 

1902 births
1960 deaths
Communist Party of the Soviet Union members
Crimean Tatar politicians
People from Perekopsky Uyezd